Francis Stourton, 4th Baron Stourton (1485–1487) was the son and successor of the third Baron Stourton. His mother was Katherine Berkeley, daughter of Sir Maurice Berkeley.

He died at approximately 2 years, and was succeeded by his uncle William, a younger son of the second Baron Stourton and his wife Margaret Chidiock.

References
 Kidd, Charles and David Williamson (editors). Debrett's Peerage and Baronetage (1995 edition). London: St. Martin's Press, 1995.

1485 births
1487 deaths
04
15th-century English nobility